One theory is that Hampson (Hempson, O'Hampson, O'hAmhsaigh, O'Hampsey) is an Irish surname. The small clan of O’hAmhsaigh (O’Hampsey) had become O'Hamson by 1659, when it is recorded in the census of 1659 as one of the principal Irish surnames in the barony of Keenaght, and as O'Hampson and Hampson it is found in the contemporary Hearth Money Rolls for County Londonderry.

Within Ireland, variants of the surname Hampson or Hampsey originated as shortened Anglicized forms of the Gaelic surname Ó hAmhsaigh, meaning ‘descendant of Amhsach’. Amhsach’ is a byname meaning ‘mercenary soldier’ or ‘messenger’, and derives from the Old Irish adjective amhasach ‘aggressive’. After 1700, the name is seldom seen except as Hanson or Hampson, though the Irish musician Denis O’Hampson, 1695–1793, County Londonderry, is known to have used O'Hampsey/Hempson as alternative forms.

Wills and other records indicate that for the past two centuries members of the clan were to be found to some extent in other Ulster counties as well as County Londonderry. A Charles Hampson was among the purchasers of forfeited estates in County Cavan in 1700 and a Captain Hampson is also listed in the same connection. There is a pedigree of Hampson of County Cavan in the Genealogical Office which indicates that this family was of Irish origin. Although most members of this clan seem to have emigrated to Scotland, Northern England and America between 1240 and 1700 there are still some hAmpson / O'hAmhsaigh members to be found on the electoral rolls in their heart land of County Londonderry, as well as in County Dublin and the County Wicklow area.

Earlier, English, origins of the Hampson family name 

The above Irish derivation is controversial, in that traditional genealogical information has it that the Yorkshire Hampson surname predates the Irish derivation.  To wit:

"The English surname HAMPSON is of patronymic origin, and simple means 'Son of Hamon' [or Haman], with the letter "p" being intrusive as in the case of Thompson. Records from the 14th and 15th Centuries show that Hamon was a popular choice as a forename. Its diminutives - Hamelot, Hamonet and Hameline surviving into the 18th Century as a Baptismal name, Hamon having lapsed by then into oblivion.

"Records from 1379 in Yorkshire include the reference to one Robertus Hameson and in 1354 the Register of the Freeman of the City of York record Robert Hamsane. The Yorkshire Poll Tax Returns refer to a Henry Hampson in 1540."

With this evidence, the Yorkshire origin Hampson surname likely predates the Londonderry origin, although the name is much more prevalent in Lancashire than Yorkshire.

Notable Hampsons
Alfred Hampson (1865–1924), Australian politician
Anne Hampson (1928–2014), British novelist
Art Hampson (born 1947), Former Canadian ice hockey player
Billy Hampson (1882–1966), English football player and manager
Daphne Hampson (born 1944), British theologian 
Denis Hampson, Donnchadh Ó Hámsaigh or Denis Hampsey (1695–1807), Irish harper
Frank Hampson (1918–1985), British illustrator 
Garrett Hampson (born 1994), American baseball player
George Hampson, (1860–1936), British entomologist
Gord Hampson (born 1959), Canadian hockey player
James K. Hampson (1877–1956), American archaeologist
Jimmy Hampson (1906–1938), English footballer
John Hampson, American guitarist and vocalist
Joshua Hampson (born 2006), British Games designer
Justin Hampson (born 1980), American baseball player
Keith Hampson (born 1943), British politician
Matt Hampson (born 1984), English rugby player
Norman Hampson (born 1922), English historian
Robert Hampson (disambiguation), several people
Sarah Hampson (born 1958), Canadian journalist 
Shaun Hampson (born 1988), Australian footballer
Steve Hampson (born 1961), English rugby player
Stuart Hampson (born 1947), English executive 
Ted Hampson (born 1936), Canadian hockey player
Thomas Hampson (disambiguation), several people
Tommy Hampson (1907–1965), English athlete, Olympic champion 1932
Tommy Hampson, English football player
Walker Hampson (1889–1959), English footballer

Anglicised Irish-language surnames
English-language surnames